The Astor Historic District is located in Green Bay, Wisconsin. It was added to the National Register of Historic Places in 1980.

History
The Astor Historic District is made up of what was once the Town of Astor, founded in 1835 by John Jacob Astor. In 1838, the Town of Astor and the Town of Navarino merged to form what is now the City of Green Bay.

References

Commercial buildings on the National Register of Historic Places in Wisconsin
Green Bay, Wisconsin
Commercial buildings completed in 1835
Historic districts on the National Register of Historic Places in Wisconsin
National Register of Historic Places in Brown County, Wisconsin